Santo Domingo Church, formally known as the National Shrine of Our Lady of the Most Holy Rosary  (Spanish: Santuario Nacional de Nuestra Señora del Santísimo Rosario; Filipino: Pambansang Dambana ng Mahal na Birhen ng Santo Rosaryo), is the largest church in Metro Manila and one of the biggest churches in Asia.  It is dedicated to Mary, mother of Jesus under her title Our Lady of the Most Holy Rosary.

This is the sixth church complex that has served as the motherhouse or headquarters of the Dominican Order of the Philippines. The Dominicans were one of the "pioneering missionaries" of the Philippines.  The motherhouse was transferred to the Quezon City location after the Manila location was destroyed during World War II in the Philippines.

Previous church buildings
Prior to its current location, the Dominican Order in the Philippines were headquartered in the city of Manila.  They had five church buildings, each destroyed by fire, earthquakes, and lastly, bombardment from Imperial Japanese forces during World War II.

Early church (1587)
The first Catholic missionaries to arrive in Manila were Spanish Augustinians who came in 1571 with Miguel López de Legazpi. The Franciscans came a few years later, in 1578. It was in 1587 that the first Dominicans arrived in Manila from Cádiz in Spain. They were welcomed by Domingo Salazar OP, the first Bishop of Manila. The order temporarily stayed at the Franciscan convent in Manila while some of them were sent north to Pangasinan and west to Bataan to begin missionary work. Salazar sponsored 3,000 pesos for the construction of the church and 300 pesos for the purchase of land. On January 1, 1588, the church (made of light materials) was inaugurated and it enshrined an image of Our Lady of the Rosary from Mexico.

Second church (1592)
In 1589, the church was partially destroyed by an earthquake. As the roof had collapsed, the Dominicans decided to build a larger church made of stronger material. Through the direction of Father Alonzo Jiménez, the second church was made from stone. Contributions were given by María Pérez, Captain Domingo Mendiola, and a certain Captain Castillo. The church was inaugurated on April 9, 1592.

Third church (early 17th century)
A fire on April 30, 1603 destroyed a third of a city, including the church and its convent. Almost immediately after the blaze, a bigger and costlier third church was built. It contained a stone vault as precaution against fire and earthquake; and donations were used to fund construction. Though made of stone, it was destroyed by another earthquake on November 30, 1645, leaving only the high altar standing.

Fourth church (1862)
A fourth church of stone and hardwood was built. It had wooden arches and wooden posts supporting the roof, thus dividing it into three naves. The artistic interior designs were executed under the direction of Father Francisco Gainza. The church took two years to build, and its structural soundness made it last for 250 years. Initiated by Father Castro, a new façade was planned. Flanked by two towers, it was patterned after London’s St Paul's Cathedral, designed by Christopher Wren. Work on the façade alone lasted almost a year. The church was inaugurated on June 15, 1862 with great festivity. On June 3, 1863, the Philippines experienced one of the strongest earthquakes in its history, the church ruined by quake of the same intensity as that which hit Manila in 1645.

Fifth church (1868)
A few months after the 1863 earthquake, Félix Róxas presented a plan for the church’s reconstruction, partly following the plan of the previous church and utilizing some of its salvageable parts. On August 30, 1864, the cornerstone of the present church was laid. In it was placed a lead box, containing art objects, gold coins, medals of saints and other things belonging to the “Orden de Predicadores”. Construction occurred from 1864 to 1887 in the gotico fingido (neo-Gothic) style, using Philippine building materials. The immense columns resembling spreading tree branches, were of acle, molave and ipil. The vault was of zinc or galvanized iron. The stained glass windows were ordered from Europe. The four retablos were made under the direction of Father Joaquín Sabater, a professor of drawing at the University of Santo Tomás. Alberoni directed the painting of the main altar.

Although Fr. Sixto and Fr. Ristoro would supervise construction of the church, the Dominicans contracted the services of the European-trained architect Félix Roxas. Sr. Roxas, adapting the seismic realities, designed a church with story of stone an upper story of wood. He worked closely with Isabelo Tampinco who decorated the interior with carving imitating the fan vault reminiscent of the English Gothic; the walls and ceiling of the sacristy were similarly treated. Even the furniture in the sacristy was treated in the Gothic manner. The chapel of the Nuestra Señora de Rosario had an altar with lancet arches and Gothic-inspired ornamented pinnacles. Its floor was made of native molave and narra and the pulpit was of fine carving, with the images representing the different saints of the Order. A dove was attached to the sounding board of the pulpit, above which, there was an angel. The choir-loft was spacious and was protected by wrought from railing manufactured in the Philippines. Over the central doorway, on the roof was enclosed in a glass case original Virgin of the Rosary, which had been there for many centuries. The central altar had three saints. In the center was Saint Dominic, at the left was Saint Francis and at the right was Saint Theresa of Jesus. Above Saint Dominic was the statue of Saint Mary Magdalene. The cupola above had many colored glass windows. Inside, was a balcony surrounded by iron railing.

Our Lady of the Rosary had a separate chapel at the right of the high altar. This image was donated by the Governor-General Luis Perez Dasmarinas and carved by a Chinese, under competent direction. Many persons claim to have secured much help from this marvelous image especially from women, who placed the skirt of the image over their abdomen during their difficult delivery. It was recorded that this image saved the island during the Dutch invasions of 1646 and that on October 5, 1907, it was canonically crowned. Its ivory hands and face, costly garments and crown were very artistic. Saint Dominic was at the left of the image, kneeling and receiving a rosary, while at the right was Saint Catalina de Siena. In the same chapel, there were two more lofty altars. The one at the right, was dedicated to Saint Vincent Ferrer, and the other on the left, to the Holy Family. In this chapel, the interesting historical canvas, painted in Rome in 1909, represented the priest, Saint Dominic, baptizing a Chinese while the two other natives stand watching him. Near this chapel was the sacristy in which were the chests of camagon with their fine carvings. These chests contained the costly vestments of the priests. A big crucifix was at one end of the hall near a stairway leading to the monastery. Below this image there was a half-length portrait of the Virgin Dolores. On the walls of sacristy, there were canvases of interest and value from a religious standpoint. There were four more altars in the main church. The two on the left were dedicated to the Immaculate Conception and in Saint Thomas respectively: the two on the right, to Our Savior and to Saint Joseph. Below the Crucifix was the “Santo Sepulcro” which could be seen thru the glass cover. From the lofty ceiling of the church, there were costly and heavy chandeliers, and on the lateral walls, there were images carved in wood, showing the different stages of the life of Christ.

The church incurred damage over time and was repaired. In 1887, the vault and the rose windows of batikuling were restored. The main altar was almost totally renovated, and the columns repaired.  The roof of the bell towers was renovated to assume a crown-like form. In 1941, the Gothic church of Santo Domingo in Intramuros was destroyed at the advent of the Second World War. On December 27, 1941 the church and the Dominican monastery beside it were hit by Japanese bombs. This was the first church to be ruined during the Pacific War. The friars, archives, the image of Our Lady of the Holy Rosary of La Naval and other movable property like ivory statues, gala vestments of the Virgin; jewelry, and sacred vessels were the only survivors of the war. The image was transferred to Santísimo Rosario Church at the University of Santo Tomás (UST) in España, Manila. The ruins was subsequently demolished, and the church transferred. The site is now a financial hub with occupants including Bank of the Philippine Islands, with a historical marker reminding visitors of what used to stand on the site.

Current building (1954)

After the Second World War, the Dominicans constructed the sixth church in a new location. They built it on a portion of land they had purchased in Quezon City. The Dominicans commissioned José Ma. Zaragoza to design the building while he was still a student of architecture at UST.

Architecture
The new Santo Domingo church was built in the Art Deco combined with Spanish Modern style, which was unlike the Baroque churches built during Spanish period. The church employed the latest technique in reinforced-concrete building. The Mission-style architecture includes Romanesque and Gothic designs that accommodate more space. It is the biggest church in Metro Manila and one of the biggest churches in Asia. The Santo Domingo church complex was inaugurated on October 12, 1954. They icon of Our Lady of La Naval was brought to the new church in 1957 in a spectacular procession.

The church façade has receding planes with leaves designed in corbel arches. Over the triple portals of the church is a high-relief frieze depicting the story of La Naval de Manila. The giant bas-relief of Santo Domingo was designed by the Italian sculptor and expatriate Francesco Monti.

In the nave of the church there are eight colorful murals by National Artist Carlos Francisco depicting the life and times of Santo Domingo de Guzmán, the Spaniard who founded the Order of Preachers. Francisco’s murals are just below the equally brilliant murals of the Four Evangelists in vivid brown tones by Vicente García Llamas.

Curved windows of the church frame masterful stained-glass designs by Galo Ocampo whose bases show different ecclesiastical seals. The windows depict the original 15 Mysteries of the Holy Rosary as well as the Battles of Lepanto and La Naval de Manila; and the martyrdoms of San Vicente Liem de la Paz and San Francisco Capillas, Dominican protomartyrs of Vietnam and China, respectively. Right behind Sto. Domingo Church’s facade is an intricately carved panels and stained glass windows lie a treasure trove of the Philippines’ rich cultural heritage and the object of centuries-old devotion, the image of Our Lady of the Rosary, La Naval de Manila, the oldest Philippine-made ivory Marian icon in the country.

The First Altar Boys
During the first few days of the new church, 3 boys playing on the grounds of the church were seen and recruited them by then Prior of the convent/church, Fr. Pedro Tejeron, O.P. They were 13-Year old Augustus C.A. Feria, his brother 11-year old Victory A. Feria and their nephew, 11-year old Vicente F. Sison.

On another note, Edilberto P.Feria and his brother, Reynaldo P. Feria joined the first Tiple of the Sto. Domingo Church.

Treasures

Aside from being an architectural jewel, the Santo Domingo Church houses artistic treasures. The second to sixth Santo Domingos were bound by a common symbol, the image of the Nuestra Señora del Santísmo Rosario, La Naval de Manila. The image of Our Lady of the Holy Rosary is kept on the left side altar all year round, except during the October fiesta when a special canopy and platforms are built for it behind the main altar. The image of Our Lady of the Rosary has been the object of Filipino devotion that dates back to the 16th century, and the icon’s shrine in Quezon City is host to an annual feast that culminates in a procession that draws tens of thousands of devotees. Opposite in the left, a side altar dedicated to Saint Martín de Porres.

Devotees of Our Lady of the Rosary would offer her jewelry. In the church’s jewellery collection, the La Naval image has a brooch described as “studded with small diamonds, seed pearls and colored gems.” It is believed to have been offered to the Virgin by a certain Josefa Roxas Manio, a native of Calumpit, Bulacan, in the 19th century, after having received it as a courtship gift from Norodom I of Cambodia.

Somewhere in the vast church complex is a secret vault holding centuries-old ivory icons and wooden images of saints made by Filipino craftsmen; exquisite, gem-studded, age-old crowns; golden Marian robes; and fine jewelry for the Virgin presented by fervent devotees. The secrecy about the vault makes sense: In October 1762, thieves broke into the Sto. Domingo Church in Intramuros and took some of its rare treasures, prompting security of the church's treasures since then. Other treasures that are deemed fit for public viewing can be found in the church's museum, to the left of the church.

Another notable gift is the National Artist medallion, which ardent devotee Nick Joaquin instructed his heirs to donate to the Virgin before he died in 2004. The medallion has been affixed to the statue’s foot since then.
Stored in the vault, according to the book, are prewar ivory heads and hands for statues of several saints, including St. Dominic, St. Vincent Ferrer, St. Catherine de Ricci, St. Agnes of Montepulciano and St. Antoninus of Florence.

Pipe organ

In the giant choir loft is almost a century-old pipe organ made by Fray Gregorio Hontomin, OP made in Rosaryhill in Hong Kong. The Dominicans transferred the pipe organ from Hong Kong to the Sto. Domingo Church in 1954 after the Chapel of St. Albert the Great’s Priory, the center of religious formation and studies of the Dominican Province of the Holy Rosary, closed. The inauguration of the pipe organ was June 9, 1959. It was restored to its grandeur by Diego Cera Organbuilders Inc., custodians of the world-famous Las Piñas bamboo organ. The restoration involved repositioning of the pipe organs from the edges to slightly forward, reconstruction and modernization of the organ console from scratch, and most likely a reworked wind pump system.

Museo de Santo Domingo 
The Santo Domingo Museum (also Museo de Santo Domingo) houses other valuable objects—such as centuries-old crucifixes made of gold and silver, rosaries and a tabernacle, all of which had been used in the old Santo. Domingo Church in Intramuros.

Columbary and Mortuary
The church has two mortuary facilities located at the right side of the church where wakes can be held for the deceased. One is located below the belfry of the church, and the other, at the right side beside the altar and the entrance to their columbary. In addition, the former idle area and storage area of the church, at the rear part of the church adjacent to the altar has been developed to be a columbary, and an interment area. Called the Santuario de Santo Domingo, the facility offers columbary vaults for urns, with sections named after Dominican Saints. The central part of the Santuario is exclusively dedicated to the Order of Preachers, housing urns, bones and interred remains of Dominican clergymen.

Declaration as a National Cultural Treasure
The Dominicans endorsed the designation of the Santo Domingo Church and the Shrine of Our Lady of the Holy Rosary as a National Culture Treasure to the National Museum in 2011. It has been listed as a National Cultural Treasure following the signing of Museum Declaration no. 4 on October 4, 2012 during the enthronement rites of the image of  Our Lady of the Most Holy Rosary, La Naval de Manila and unveiling of the official marker on December 8, 2012. The declaration is the highest distinction the government can confer on a cultural property. The declaration follows Republic Act No. 4846, otherwise known as the Cultural Properties Preservation and Protection Act. It is the first national cultural treasure listed in Quezon City.

Gallery

References

External links

 Diocese of Cubao

Roman Catholic churches in Quezon City
Churches in the Roman Catholic Diocese of Cubao
Roman Catholic national shrines in the Philippines
National Cultural Treasures of the Philippines
Roman Catholic churches completed in 1954
1954 establishments in the Philippines
Works of National Artists of the Philippines
20th-century Roman Catholic church buildings in the Philippines